Laura Stephens (born 2 June 1999) is a British swimmer. She competed in the women's 200 metre butterfly at the 2019 World Aquatics Championships.

References

External links
 
 
 
 
 

1999 births
Living people
English female swimmers
British butterfly swimmers
Place of birth missing (living people)
Swimmers at the 2015 European Games
European Games medalists in swimming
European Games bronze medalists for Great Britain
European Aquatics Championships medalists in swimming
Swimmers at the 2018 Commonwealth Games
Swimmers at the 2022 Commonwealth Games
Commonwealth Games medallists in swimming
Commonwealth Games silver medallists for England
Commonwealth Games bronze medallists for England
Swimmers at the 2020 Summer Olympics
Olympic swimmers of Great Britain
21st-century British women
Sportspeople from London
Medallists at the 2022 Commonwealth Games